Laramate District is one of twenty-one districts of the province Lucanas in Peru.

Geography 
Other mountains are listed below:

References